Christian Kane (born Christopher Michael Short) is an American actor and singer-songwriter. He is known for his roles in the television shows Angel, Leverage, The Librarians, and Into the West, and the movies Just Married, Taxi, and Secondhand Lions.

Kane is the lead singer of the country-southern rock band Kane. On December 7, 2010, they released The House Rules, their third album and their debut for record label Bigger Picture Music Group. The album reached no. 25 on the Billboard Country Albums chart. The first single from the album, also titled "The House Rules", debuted at no. 54 on the Billboard Country Songs chart. The second single, “Let Me Go”, was released on July 11, 2011.

Early life
Kane has stated that he is of Cherokee (Native American) ancestry. His parents participated in, and met at, the rodeo. The family moved around the South because his father was in the oil business, and they finally settled in Norman, Oklahoma, when Kane was in eighth grade. While growing up in Texas and Oklahoma, Kane was a collegiate-style wrestler and played football (as a strong safety). He studied art history at the University of Oklahoma, but decided he wanted to be an actor and headed to Los Angeles before finishing the degree. In Los Angeles, he worked at a talent management company, where he delivered scripts in exchange for getting acting jobs.

Career

Acting

Kane landed his first acting role in 1997 as one of the leads in MGM's television series Fame L.A. playing a country singer who moved to Los Angeles from Kansas.  His television roles have included a recurring role in Joss Whedon’s Angel as the lawyer Lindsey MacDonald, the Jerry Bruckheimer-produced series Close to Home on CBS, the TNT television film Crossfire Trail in which he appeared alongside Tom Selleck, and the role of Abe Wheeler in the Steven Spielberg-produced 2005 miniseries Into the West. He starred as Billy Ryan in the MTV movie Love Song in 2000, alongside R&B artist Monica.

Kane’s appearances on the big screen include the 20th Century Fox film Just Married and New Line Cinema's Secondhand Lions (as the younger version of Robert Duvall's Hub McCann, he has a scar on his upper lip from an injury he received while filming the movie). He also appeared in Taxi, Life or Something Like It, the Peter Berg-directed Friday Night Lights, and the Warner Bros. baseball film Summer Catch.

In 2007, Kane was featured in the Carrie Underwood music video "So Small", playing the role of one of the three converging stories. In 2009, he appeared in the psychological thriller, Hide, in which he played the lead role of Billy, and The Donner Party which is based on the true story of the Donner Party. In 2010, he starred in the romantic drama, Not Since You.

From 2008 to 2012, Kane appeared on the TNT television series Leverage as Eliot Spencer, a retrieval specialist and black ops soldier who teams up with four other specialists to undo the injustices perpetrated upon the helpless.  Kane performed all his own fight scenes and also choreographed fights for the series. Kane plays the same character in Leverage:Redemption, which premiered in July 2021, streaming on IMDb TV. The show takes up the team's adventures 8 years after the last episode.

In 2013, Kane appeared as JT Maxwell, brother to Rebecca Romijn's female lead Michelle Maxwell on TNT's King & Maxwell. He appeared again with Romijn. co-starring in the 2014 to 2018 TNT television series The Librarians, based on The Librarian film series.

In 2020, Kane starred as Alex Walker on the drama series Almost Paradise. In an interview with Tell-Tale TV, Kane described that character as being several of his previous roles on other series rolled into one.

Music
In 1997, Kane met Steve Carlson, who had taken over his old job. They started writing songs together, and in 1998 formed the Southern rock band Kane. They have toured the U.S., as well as England and Germany. The band has self-released two albums, their self-titled debut, Kane, in 2002, and a recording of a live acoustic set, Acoustic Live In London! in 2004.

The band consists of Kane (lead vocals, guitar), Carlson (rhythm guitar, backing vocals), Jason Southard (lead guitar), Will Amend (bass guitar), and Ryan Baker (drums)  and is signed to independent record label Bigger Picture Music Group. Their label debut, The House Rules, was released December 7, 2010. It debuted at no. 1 on the Billboard Heatseekers album chart and no. 25 on the Country Albums chart. The album was produced by Bob Ezrin and Jimmie Lee Sloas.

The first single from the album, also titled "The House Rules", debuted at no. 54 on the Billboard Country Songs chart and was the seventh-most added song on Mediabase Country stations on its official impact date. The video for the single was directed by Timothy Hutton and premiered on CMT's Big New Music Weekend October 1, 2010. "The House Rules" was featured in the video game NASCAR 09. The second single, "Let Me Go", was released on July 11, 2011. The video for the single, directed by Roman White, premiered on CMT August 8, 2011 and reached no. 1 on their Today's Top Videos chart .

Kane is also signed to a songwriting deal with EMI Music Publishing and writes much of his own material. Trace Adkins released a song written by Kane called "Happy Man" on his 2010 album, Cowboy's Back in Town.

Kane's co-writing efforts include songs written with Blair Daly, Brett James, David Lee Murphy, Casey Beathard, and Jerrod Niemann. "Thinking of You", a song he co-wrote with Blair Daly, was featured in Leverage Season 3 episode, "The Studio Job."

Filmography

Film

Television

Video game

Discography

Soundtrack

Studio albums

Extended plays

Live albums

Singles

Music videos

References

External links

 
 

Living people
American country singer-songwriters
American male film actors
American male television actors
Columbia Records artists
Male actors from Dallas
Musicians from Norman, Oklahoma
Bigger Picture Music Group artists
20th-century American male actors
21st-century American male actors
Singer-songwriters from Oklahoma
21st-century American singers
Country musicians from Texas
Country musicians from Oklahoma
American people who self-identify as being of Native American descent
Year of birth missing (living people)
Singer-songwriters from Texas